Wilhelm Marais (5 January 1908 – 24 September 1993) was a South African cricketer and cricket umpire. He stood in five Test matches between 1956 and 1958.

See also
 List of Test cricket umpires

References

1908 births
1993 deaths
People from Mossel Bay
Eastern Province cricketers
South African Test cricket umpires